Par où t'es rentré ? On t'a pas vu sortir is a 1984 French comedy film starring Jerry Lewis and Connie Nielsen. It was filmed and released in 1984 in France by the Gaumont Film Company.

Plot
Clovis Blaireau is a private detective who is hired to spy on the cheating husband by his wife.

Although Clovis fails to gain any evidence that he is cheating, he does wind up becoming friends with the husband.  The two new friends get involved with mobsters and they flee to Tunisia.  Once there they are mistaken for mobsters, themselves, and get mixed up in a fast-food empire war.  Eventually they straighten everything out and open a restaurant together, a combination American Fast Food and Oriental Slow Food establishment.

Cast
 Jerry Lewis as Clovis Blaireau
 Philippe Clair as Prosper de Courtaboeuf
 Marthe Villalonga as Nadège de Courtaboeuf / Rosette Cioccolini
 Jackie Sardou as Pauline, la mère de Clovis
 Connie Nielsen as Eva (credited as Connie Nielson)

Release
This was one of two films that Lewis made in the 1980s strictly for European release.  They have never been released in the US, although it was given a tentative US release title: How Did You Get In? We Didn't See You Leave.  

Lewis, speaking about this film and Retenez Moi...Ou Je Fais Un Malheur, said that "as long as I have control [over distribution], you'll never see them in this country [United States]".

References

External links
http://www.unifrance.org/film/3441/par-ou-t-es-rentre-on-t-a-pas-vu-sortir

https://video.fnac.com/mp20187384/Par-ou-t-es-rentre-On-t-as-Pas-Vu-Sortir-Jerry-Lewis-40x56cm-AFFICHE-Cinema-Originale
http://www.allocine.fr/video/player_gen_cmedia=19554317&cfilm=46089.html

1984 films
1984 comedy films
French comedy films
Films scored by Alan Silvestri
Gaumont Film Company films
1980s French films